Muhammad Hanif @ Abdul Hadi bin Hamir (born 22 February 1997) is a Bruneian professional footballer who plays as a defender for DPMM FC.

Club career
Hanif is a graduate of Brunei's Sports School, the institution that also produced Bruneian internationals such as Azwan Ali Rahman and Shafie Effendy. He began his league football career with Najip FC in 2014, a team that lost every game in their previous season. Coached by the late Johari Bungsu, Hanif achieved a third-place finish with Najip FC in the 2014 Brunei Super League and also reached the final of the FA Cup that season, scoring the winner in the semi-final along the way.

Brunei's football association NFABD created Tabuan Muda in 2015, a league team that serves to prepare for international tournaments, mirroring Singapore's Young Lions and Malaysia's Harimau Muda teams. Hanif was assigned to the Under-18s playing in the Brunei Premier League at the start of the season, however he was promoted to the Brunei Super League team in the second half of the season. Tabuan Muda finished fifth in the 2015 and 2016 seasons of the BSL.

Hanif trialled out for and joined Brunei DPMM FC's Under-19 team in early 2015. Although he was overlooked for promotion in 2016, he was handed a professional contract by Steve Kean to play for DPMM in the S.League in 2017. He signed full terms on 15 January. He made his debut in the 4–0 loss against Albirex Niigata FC (S) on 16 June.

Hanif made eight league appearances for DPMM in the 2019 season en route to the championship, his first with the professional club. He left DPMM at the end of the season.

Hanif re-signed for DPMM before the 2021 Brunei Super League began on 11 June 2021. A year later, he won the Brunei FA Cup after beating Kasuka FC in the final on 4 December 2022.

After DPMM returned to the Singapore Premier League in 2023, Hanif scored the winner against Tanjong Pagar United on 15 March at Jalan Besar Stadium in a 2–1 victory.

International career

Hanif has been playing for the national team and its various youth teams since 2014. His youth tournaments include the 2014 Hassanal Bolkiah Trophy for Under-21, the 28th SEA Games for Under-23, the 2015 AFF U-19 Youth Championship and the 2016 AFC U-19 Championship qualification with the Under-19s.

Hanif was called up to the national team for the 2018 World Cup qualifiers against Chinese Taipei in March 2015. He started both games at centre-back in a 1-2 aggregate loss which eliminated Brunei from the 2018 World Cup.

Hanif played in a 6-1 drubbing by Cambodia in a friendly on 3 November 2015. His next callup was at the 2016 AFF Suzuki Cup qualification matches held in Cambodia in October, and started all three matches. He missed out on the 2016 AFC Solidarity Cup squad a fortnight later due to injury.

In 2017, Hanif was announced as one of Brunei's athletes for the year's SEA Games football tournament held in Malaysia in August, playing with the under-23s. However he was replaced by Nadzri Erwan on the eve of the biennial sporting event.

Hanif was appointed captain of the Brunei Under-23 squad for the 2020 AFC U-23 Championship qualification matches that was held in Vietnam in late March 2019. They finished with three losses in three games.

Yet to register an appearance in the 2019 Singapore Premier League, Hanif accepted a callup to the senior national team for the two-legged 2022 World Cup qualification matches against Mongolia in June of that year. He was deployed by Robbie Servais as a starter in both games alongside captain Sairol Sahari at centre-back. In the first leg, he was at the short end of a weak backpass by Helmi Zambin for the crucial second Mongolia goal. The second match was also eventful for Hanif as he was the one who felled Narmandakh Artag inside the penalty box that led to a Mongolia penalty scored by Tsedenbal Norjmoo. Brunei were beaten 2-3 on aggregate and failed to progress to Round 2 of the qualification process.

Hanif was selected and started the friendly match away against Laos on 27 March 2022 which ended in a 3–2 loss. Later in the year, he was retained for a tri-nation tournament in late September involving the Maldives and Laos and played in both fixtures. That December, he was selected for the Brunei squad for the 2022 AFF MItsubishi Electric Cup in their second ever appearance at the level since 1996. He was brought in as an early substitute against Thailand in a 0–5 defeat in the first group game. He then started the third game against Indonesia where he suffered an injury early in the game and was taken off.

Honours
DPMM FC
 Singapore Premier League: 2019
 Brunei FA Cup: 2022

References

External links

1997 births
Living people
Association football defenders
Bruneian footballers
Brunei international footballers
DPMM FC players
Competitors at the 2015 Southeast Asian Games
Southeast Asian Games competitors for Brunei